Lang's crag lizard (Pseudocordylus langi), also known commonly as Lang's girdled lizard, is a species of lizard in the family Cordylidae. The species is endemic to Southern Africa.

Etymology
The specific name, langi, is in honor of German taxidermist Herbert Lang.

Geographic range

Habitat
The preferred natural habitat of P. langi is grassland.

Reproduction
P. langi is ovoviviparous.

References

Further reading
Branch, Bill (2004). Field Guide to Snakes and other Reptiles of Southern Africa. Third Revised edition, Second impression. Sanibel Island, Florida: Ralph Curtis Books. 399 pp. . (Pseudocordylus langi, p. 206).
Loveridge A (1944). "Revision of the African Lizards of the Family Cordylidae". Bull. Mus. Comp. Zool., Harvard 95 (1): 1–118. (Pseudocordylus langi, new species, pp. 73–74).

Pseudocordylus
Lizards of Africa
Reptiles of Lesotho
Reptiles of South Africa
Reptiles described in 1944
Taxa named by Arthur Loveridge
Taxonomy articles created by Polbot